The 2014 Indy Grand Prix of Alabama was the third race of the 2014 IndyCar Series season. The race was run on April 27, 2014 in Birmingham, Alabama, United States at Barber Motorsports Park.

Race results

Notes
 Points include 1 point for leading at least 1 lap during a race, an additional 2 points for leading the most race laps, and 1 point for Pole Position.

Notes 
1.Race was scheduled for 90 laps but shortened due to time limit.

References

Honda Indy Grand Prix of Alabama
Grand Prix of Alabama
Indy Grand Prix
Honda Indy Grand Prix of Alabama